I Don't Need Anyone may refer to:

"I Don't Need Anyone", song by Hamilton Leithauser from Black Hours
"I Don’t Need Anyone", song by soulDecision from No One Does It Better
"I Don't Need Anyone", song by Kylie Minogue from Impossible Princess